Cryptomyelois glaucobasis is a species of snout moth in the genus Cryptomyelois. It was described by Oswald Bertram Lower and is found in Australia.

References

Moths described in 1903
Phycitini